Musita is a town in Mayuge District, in the Eastern Region of Uganda.

Location
Musita is in Mulingirire parish, Baitambogwe sub-county. The coordinates of the Musita are 0°31'40.0"N 33°23'05.0"E (Latitude:0.527778; Longitude:33.384722).

Overview
The  Musita–Mayuge–Lumino–Majanji–Busia Road makes a T-junction with the Jinja–Iganga Road (A-109) in the center of Musita town. The central market in Musita had over 1,500 traders in February 2015.

References

Populated places in Eastern Region, Uganda
Cities in the Great Rift Valley
Mayuge District